Alice Brooke Bodington or Alice Brook (22 May 1840 – 15 February 1897) was a British Canadian science writer who wrote about biology, evolution and race.

Life

Alice Brooke was born in 1840 to Francis and Juliana Brooke. After her mother's death, she was raised primarily by her paternal grandmother. In 1851 the 10 year old Alice was living with her widowed father in a large house in Suffolk, England, which included seven household servants and a governess. She married Major General Edward William Derrington Bell in Suffolk in 1857. The marriage produced one live child Edward Bell (1866-1937) and ended in divorce in 1869 following Alice's adultery with Captain Tyesen Holrod who may have been Edward's biological father. Alice was remarried in 1873 to widower and physician Dr George Fowler Bodington. The couple had 4 children and remained married until her death in 1897.

The Boddingtons moved to Canada in 1887 in search of new economic opportunities. Soon after their arrival, the family settled on a farm in the Fraser River valley. Farm life did not agree with Bodington. After her husband received a position as medical superintendent at a hospital, the family moved to New Westminster British Columbia in 1895.

Contributions 
Bodington wrote about a wide variety of subjects including religion, race, marriage and evolution. Her articles where printed in publications such as The American Naturalist, Popular Science Monthly, The Journal of Microscopy and Natural Science, and The Westminster Review. Her work remains an important window into the popular scientific culture of the 19th century and the climate of British imperialism.

Her book Studies in Evolution and Biology, received a positive review in The American Naturalist. Bodington was an advocate of neo-Lamarckism. She was an avid supporter of the dissemination of scientific literature, believing that scientific knowledge needed to be accessible to the people if it were to be of any real use to society. Bodington believed that many scientists lacked the ability to express their findings in a way clear and understandable to non-professionals. She viewed herself as a promoter of science and played a role similar to that of a modern pundit. In her writings for The Westminster Review, she discussed the development of the brain and argued the inferiority of Africans. Her single book was criticized for her comments questioning why writers on Science were meant to perform experiments.

Works
  "Curiosities of Evolution", in Popular Science Monthly Volume 33, October 1888
 "Studies in Evolution and Biology" (1890)
 "The Importance of Race and Its Bearing on the "Negro Question" (October, 1890), Westminster Review
 “The Hidden Self”, The Open Court, a Quarterly Magazine Dec 4, 1890 
 “A Modern View of Ghosts”, The Open Court, a Quarterly Magazine Jan 14, 1892
 “Mental Evolution in Man and the Lower Animals” The American Naturalist, Vol. 26, No. 306 (Jun., 1892), pp. 482–494
 “Mental Evolution in Man and the Lower Animals (Continued)” The American Naturalist, Vol. 26, No. 307 (Jul., 1892), pp. 593–606
 “The Survival of the Unfit”, The Open Court, a Quarterly Magazine Aug 4, 1892
“Legends of the Sumiro-Accadians of Chaldea” The American Naturalist, Vol. 27, No. 313 (Jan., 1893), pp. 14–19
“Legends of the Sumiro-Accadians of Chaldea (Continued)” The American Naturalist, Vol. 27, No. 314 (Feb., 1893), pp. 105–112
“The Parasitic Protozoa Found in Cancerous Diseases” The American Naturalist, Vol. 28, No. 328 (Apr., 1894), pp. 307–315
“Insanity in Royal Families. A Study in Heredity” The American Naturalist, Vol. 29, No. 338 (Feb., 1895), pp. 118–129

References

1840 births
1897 deaths
British science writers
Lamarckism
Women science writers
19th-century women writers
British emigrants to Canada